Moalleman (also Romanized as Mo‘allemān, Maluman, and Mu‘allaman) is a village in Qohab-e Rastaq Rural District, Amirabad District, Damghan County, Semnan Province, Iran. At the 2006 census, its population was 190, in 51 families.

References 

Populated places in Damghan County